Thomas Read (May 28, 1881 – April 7, 1962) was a Republican politician from Michigan who served in the Michigan House of Representatives including as its Speaker during the 50th Legislature, as the lieutenant governor of Michigan under Alex J. Groesbeck, as a member of the Michigan State Senate, and as Michigan Attorney General.

Born in Rochester, New York of English and Scottish ancestry to Thomas and Jane Read on May 28, 1881, Read was either a candidate for or served in nearly all state-level offices in Michigan (he was never a candidate for or elected Secretary of State). He was a candidate in the primary for Governor of Michigan in 1924, losing to Alex J. Groesbeck, and 1940, losing to Luren Dickinson.

Read was a presidential elector for Michigan in 1928, casting a ballot for Herbert Hoover, and a delegate to the 1940 Republican National Convention in Philadelphia which nominated Wendell Willkie (who eventually lost to Franklin D. Roosevelt. Senator Arthur H. Vandenberg of Michigan was a candidate for the nomination at that convention.

Read died after surgery at a hospital in Kalamazoo, Michigan in 1962. The elementary school in his hometown of Shelby is named for Read.

References

1881 births
1962 deaths
Lieutenant Governors of Michigan
Michigan Attorneys General
Speakers of the Michigan House of Representatives
Republican Party members of the Michigan House of Representatives
Republican Party Michigan state senators
Politicians from Rochester, New York
People from Oceana County, Michigan
American people of English descent
American people of Scottish descent
20th-century American politicians
Lawyers from Rochester, New York
20th-century American lawyers